Peter Oliver (11 August 1926 – 18 September 2007) was a Welsh-born British actor, youth worker and theatre director. He is known for transforming the Christ Church (Oxford) United Clubs youth club at Oval House into a notable theatre.

After leaving Oval House, he acted with Pip Simmons and his company. In 1985, he emigrated to Canada with his wife, where he returned to social work.

References 

1926 births
2007 deaths
Welsh theatre directors